Luvsan-Ayuushiin Dashdemberel (born 17 May 1940) is a Mongolian cross-country skier. He competed at the 1964 Winter Olympics and the 1968 Winter Olympics.

References

1940 births
Living people
Mongolian male cross-country skiers
Olympic cross-country skiers of Mongolia
Cross-country skiers at the 1964 Winter Olympics
Cross-country skiers at the 1968 Winter Olympics
People from Selenge Province
20th-century Mongolian people